This is the first edition of the tournament since 2008, when Justine Henin won the title. Henin retired from professional tennis for the final time on 26 January 2011.

Andrea Petkovic won the title by default when Carla Suárez Navarro withdrew from the final with a neck injury.  Petkovic saved eight match points against Alison Van Uytvanck in her second round match.

In lieu of playing the final, Petkovic participated in an exhibition match against former world No. 1 and tournament director Kim Clijsters. Clijsters won the match 5–3.

Seeds
The top four seeds received a bye into the second round.

Draw

Finals

Top half

Bottom half

Qualifying

Seeds

Qualifiers

Draw

First qualifier

Second qualifier

Third qualifier

Fourth qualifier

References
Main Draw
Qualifying Draw

External links

2015 Singles
2015 WTA Tour
2015 in Belgian tennis